Dominik Finkelde (born 31 May 1970) is a German Jesuit priest, philosopher and playwright.

Life and work 
After graduating from high school, Finkelde studied philosophy, theology and literature in Berlin, Munich and Paris. In 2003, he earned his doctorate with a thesis on Walter Benjamin (Benjamin reads Proust) at the Munich School of Philosophy. Parallel to his studies, he joined the Jesuit Order in 1996 and began further education there. During the Magisterium, a two-year period of practical experience, he worked in the pastoral work in Mexico City and as lecturer of philosophy at the Universidad Iberoamericana. He was assistant professor at the Munich School of Philosophy between 2010 and 2015 and habilitated at the Institute of Philosophy at the Goethe University Frankfurt am Main in 2014. Since 2015 he has been professor of contemporary philosophy and epistemology at the Munich School of Philosophy.

Since the mid-1990s, Finkelde has emerged as the author of dramatic and scientific texts. In 1996, he received the Gerhart Hauptmann Prize (together with Jens Roselt) for his first play, "Abendgruß", which premiered in 1998 at the Theater Madgeburg, depicting the fictitious biography of a former East German border guard. In the award of the jury, Klaus Völker wrote: "Here we have a small, very sensitive and cautiously depicted family drama ... in the tradition of Ibsen". His dystopia Berlin Underground is about the breakup of the two-class society in the near future and was premiered in 1999 by the Landesbühne Niedersachsen Nord in Wilhelmshaven. Other plays by Finkelde were staged in Bielefeld, Augsburg and Cottbus.

Bibliography

Philosophy 
 Benjamin liest Proust. Mimesislehre-Sprachtheorie-Poetologie. Fink, München 2003, .
 Politische Eschatologie nach Paulus. Badiou, Agamben, Žižek, Santner. Turia & Kant, Wien 2007, .
 Slavoj Žižek zwischen Lacan und Hegel. Politische Philosophie, Metapsychologie, Ethik. Turia & Kant, Wien 2009, .
 Exzessive Subjektivität. Eine Theorie tathafter Neubegründung des Ethischen nach Kant, Hegel und Lacan. Karl Alber, Freiburg 2015, .
 Jacques Lacan. Struktur. Andersheit. Subjektkonstitution. August, Berlin 2015, .
 Phantaschismus. Von der totalitären Versuchung unserer Demokratie. Vorwerk 8, Berlin 2016, .
 Michel de Certeaus Metatheorie der Mystik. In: Janez Perčič, Johannes Herzgsell (Hrsg.): Grosse Denker des Jesuitenordens. Ferdinand Schöningh, Paderborn 2016, S. 121–134
 Das Objekt, das zu viel wusste. Eine Einführung in die Philosophie nach Lacan (Vorlesungen), Turia & Kant, Wien 2022, .

Editorials 

 Žižek Responds!, Eds, Dominik Finkelde and Todd McGowan, Bloomsbury Academic, 2023, .
 Parallax: The Dialectics of Mind and World, Eds Dominik Finkelde, Slavoj Žižek and Christoph Menke, Bloomsbury Academic, 2021, .
 In Need of a Master: Politics, Theology, and Radical Democracy, Eds. Dominik Finkelde and Rebekka Klein, De Gruyter, 2021, .
 Badiou and the State, Ed. Dominik Finkelde, Nomos, 2017, .

Translated Works 
 Excessive Subjectivity -- Kant, Hegel, Lacan, and the Foundations of Ethics, Deva Kemmis and Astrid Weigert (trs.), Columbia University Press, 2017, .

Drama 
 Abendgruß. Uraufführung am 1. Mai 1998, Freie Kammerspiele, Magdeburg.
 Berlin Underground. Uraufführung am 18. September 1999, Landesbühne Niedersachsen Nord, Wilhelmshaven.
 Atlantis. Uraufführung am 12. Mai 2001, Theater Bielefeld.
 Porzellanschiff. Uraufführung am 26. Oktober 2002, Landesbühne Niedersachsen Nord, Wilhelmshaven.
 Der Gutmensch. Uraufführung am 13. Juni 2003, Theater Augsburg.
 Die Nebensächlichen. Uraufführung am 3. Oktober 2008, Staatstheater Cottbus.

References

External links 
 
 
 

German philosophers
21st-century German male writers
21st-century German Jesuits
21st-century German Catholic theologians
21st-century German dramatists and playwrights
Academic staff of Universidad Iberoamericana
Writers from Berlin
German expatriates in Mexico
German expatriates in France
1970 births
Living people